Dooman River (also known as Tumen River) is a 2010 French-South Korean co-production directed by Korean-Chinese filmmaker Zhang Lu.

It received a Special Mention from the Generation 14Plus Youth Jury at the 60th Berlin International Film Festival, and won the Jury Prize at the 8th Festival Paris Cinéma, the NETPAC Award at the 15th Busan International Film Festival, Best Director (for Zhang) and Best Actress (for Yin Lan) at the 3rd International Film Festival East-West in Orenburg, and Best Film in the International Feature Competition of the 47th International Antalya Golden Orange Film Festival.

Premise
In Yanbian near the Tumen River, which serves as the border between North Korea and China's Jilin Province, two teenage boys from opposite sides of the river become friends.

Cast
Cui Jian as Chang-ho  
Yin Lan as Soon-hee  
Lin Jinlong as Grandfather
Li Jinglin
Xin Xhuangshen
Jin Xinyan
Yuan Yonglan

References

External links
 
 

2010 films
South Korean drama films
French drama films
Films directed by Zhang Lu
2010s French films
2010s South Korean films